The National Center for Manufacturing Sciences (NCMS) is a 501(c)(3) non-profit membership based consortium. Membership is limited to network of industrie, government, non-profit organizations and academia partners to develop, demonstrate, and transition innovative technologies efficiently, with resources minimization.

NCMS brings together project teams made up of technology providers, suppliers, and users to perform research and development (R&D). These project teams often include cross-industry participants.

Mission 
The NCMS mission is to lead the rapid development of cross-industry R&D programs to build the global competitiveness of its manufacturing industry partners.

Origin 
NCMS was formed in 1986 by executive order President Ronald Reagan. NCMS was created to help revitalize the machine tool industry but has grown to include all sectors of North American manufacturing.

Locations 
NCMS is based in Ann Arbor, Michigan and with offices in the following cities:
 Washington, DC
 Bremerton, Washington
 Farmington Hills, Michigan

References

External links
 NCMS Home Page National Center for Manufacturing Sciences

Research institutes established in 1986
Research institutes in the United States
1986 establishments in the United States